is a Japanese Buddhist term for awakening, "comprehension; understanding". It is derived from the Japanese verb satoru.

In the Zen Buddhist tradition, satori refers to a deep experience of kenshō,  "seeing into one's true nature". Ken means "seeing," shō means "nature" or "essence".

Satori and kenshō are commonly translated as enlightenment, a word that is also used to translate bodhi, prajñā and Buddhahood.

Definition
Satori means the experience of awakening ("enlightenment") or apprehension of the true nature of reality.  It is often considered an experience which cannot be expressed in words.  While the term satori is derived from the Japanese verb "to know" (satoru), it is distinct from the philosophical concept of knowledge as it represents a transcendence of the distinction between one that knows and knowledge.

D. T. Suzuki, a Japanese author of books and essays on Buddhism, Zen and Shin that were influential in the West, described "... looking into one's nature or the opening of satori"; and said "This acquiring of a new point of view in our dealings with life and the world is popularly called by Japanese Zen students 'satori' (wu in Chinese). It is really another name for Enlightenment (anuttarā-samyak-saṃbodhi)".

Satori and kenshō

Satori is often used interchangeably with kenshō. Kenshō refers to the perception of the Buddha-nature or emptiness. While the terms have the same meaning, customarily satori is used to refer to full, deep experience of enlightenment (such as of the Buddha), while kenshō is used to refer to a first experience of enlightenment that can still be expanded. 

Distinct from this first insight, daigo-tettei is used to refer to a "deep" or lasting realization of the nature of existence.

Importance
According to D. T. Suzuki,

This view is typical of Rinzai, which emphasizes satori. The Sōtō school rejects this emphasis, and instead emphasizes "silent illumination" through the practice of zazen.

Realizing satori
Satori is considered a "first step" or embarkation toward Buddhahood:

The student's mind must be prepared by rigorous study, with the use of koans, and the practice of meditation to concentrate the mind, under the guidance of a teacher. Koans are short anecdotes of verbal exchanges between teachers and students, typically of the Song dynasty, dealing with Buddhist teachings. The Rinzai-school utilizes classic collections of koans such as The Gateless Barrier. The Gateless Barrier was assembled by the early 13th-century Chinese Zen master Wumen Huikai.

Wumen struggled for six years with koan "Zhaozhou's dog", assigned to him by Yuelin Shiguan (月林師觀; Japanese: Gatsurin Shikan) (1143–1217), before attaining kenshō. After his understanding had been confirmed by Yuelin, Wumen wrote the following enlightenment poem:

See also

Notes

References

Sources

 
 
 
 
 

Zen Buddhist philosophical concepts
Buddhist stages of enlightenment